The African Ministers' Council on Water (AMCOW),  is considered by the African Union as the support mechanism for its Specialised Technical Committee (STC) to drive achievement in the water and sanitation sectors. It is a regional development network of 55 African countries that advances socioeconomic development and the abolition of poverty through effective cooperation, management of water supply services, and provision of the continent's water resources to its members.

History 
In  April 2002, the African Ministers responsible for water meeting in Abuja, Nigeria, formed the African Ministerial Conference on Water (AMCOW) following the adoption of the "Abuja Ministerial Declaration on Water - a key to Sustainable Development". The organization was formed to accelerate the achievement of water and sanitation goals in Africa. In 2008, at the 11th Ordinary Session of the African Union (AU) Assembly in Sharm el-Sheikh Egypt, African Heads of State and Government, mandated AMCOW to establish and monitor a strategy for the implementation of their commitments on accelerating sanitation and hygiene.

Governing structure 
The institutional structure of the AMCOW consists of a Council of Ministers (the Ministers responsible for water in each Member Country), an executive committee (EXCO) with a President/Chair, and a Board of Directors (currently Namibia). Each of the five sub-regions is represented on the executive committee by three representatives/water Ministers (AMCOW member states are divided into five sub-regions: West Africa, Eastern Africa, Central Africa, North Africa, and Southern Africa) for the coordination of sub-regional activities.

A vice president oversees each sub-region. The AMCOW Secretariat is based in Abuja, Nigeria, and is led by an interim Executive Secretary and a team of professional and support workers. A Technical Advisory Committee (TAC) serves as the Executive Committee's advisor. The executive committee is responsible for ensuring that the council's decisions are carried out, as well as developing work programs/budgets for approval by the council, mobilizing necessary funding, and supervising the Secretariat's activities.

The primary functions of AMCOW are to facilitate regional and international cooperation by coordinating policies and actions among African countries on water resources issues, to review and mobilize additional financing for the African water sector, providing a mechanism for monitoring the progress of major regional and global water resources, water supply, and sanitation initiatives.

AMCOW also serves as a forum for dialogue on water issues with UN agencies and other partners. It encourages participation in regional studies on climate change, the development of observation networks, the exchange of information, and the development of policies and strategies to address water issues in Africa.

Mission and Vision 
Mission:To provide political leadership, policy direction and advocacy in the provision, use and management of water resources for sustainable social and economic development and maintenance of African ecosystems.

Vision: To accomplish the 2025 Africa Water Vision by effectively managing Africa's water resources and providing water supply services. To foster cooperation, security, social and economic growth, and the eradication of poverty among member states.

Initiatives 
 The African Groundwater Programme
 AMCOW Pan African Groundwater Programme (APAGroP)
 African Water and Sanitation Monitoring (WASSMO) System
 African Water and Sanitation Knowledge Management Challenge
 African Sanitation Policy Guidelines (ASPG)
 Youth and Gender Inclusion program
 Online Knowledge Hub
 Mukhtari Shehu Shagari Resource Centre

Activities 

 Africa Focus Day
 Africa Water and Sanitation Week
 African Water Facility (AWF)
 AfricaSan

Achievements 
The major AMCOW achievements includes:
 Developed a 10 years water Strategic plan for implementation between 2018 and 2030.
Established a ministerial mechanism supported by a network of senior water officials for systematic consideration of water policy challenges in Africa. 
 Provided support for regional integration.
 Adopted a triennial work program that provides strategic direction for national, regional, and international cooperation.
 Provided organizational, political, and institutional support for the implementation of major water initiatives.
 Compiled key water portfolios for the five sub-regions of Africa, the establishment of the African Water Facility (AWF) which is hosted and managed by the African Development Bank, and establishment of a Trust Fund under the United Nations Environment Programme (UNEP).
 Developed reports on the AfricaSan Ngor Commitment Monitoring of Heads of State and Government to accelerate sanitation and hygiene development in Africa.
 Developed an African Groundwater Programme.
 In November 2020 a web based open access knowledge hub was launched for collecting and sharing Africa's water and sanitation information and knowledge.
 In 2021 the African Sanitation Policy Guideline was developed with the support of the Bill and Melinda Gates Foundation (BMGF).
Commemorated its 15th anniversary in November, 2017. It will be commemorating its 20th anniversary during the World Water Forum in Dakar, Senegal, in March 2022.

Member states

See also 

 African Union
 Friends of the African Union
 List of country groupings

References

External links 
*Official Website

*Specialised Technical Committee

*AMCOW 20 years of service to Africa's water and sanitation sector

African Union member economies
Water supply and sanitation in Kenya
Water supply and sanitation in Tanzania
Water supply and sanitation in Nigeria
Water and the environment
Water organizations